Carlos Martínez Rodríguez (born 27 June 1986), sometimes known as Carlitos , is a Spanish professional footballer who plays for FC Andorra as a striker.

Club career
In 2012, he signed for UE Olot of the same tier. In his first season with the club, he scored 31 goals which included a hat-trick against Arandina CF and five goals in the promotion play-offs. At the end of the season, the club was promoted to the Segunda División B.

On 3 July 2015, Carlos signed for the reserve team of Villarreal after having scored 57 goals for Olot. On 30 August, he scored for the first time for his new club by finding the net twice in a 2–0 victory against his former club Olot.

On 23 July 2017, after two years with Villarreal B, Carlos moved abroad and joined Japanese J2 League club Tokyo Verdy managed by Miguel Ángel Lotina. On 3 July 2018, he returned to Spain and joined Hércules CF.

Notes

References

External links

1986 births
Living people
Footballers from Barcelona
Spanish footballers
Association football forwards
Primera Federación players
Segunda División B players
Tercera División players
Cerdanyola del Vallès FC players
UE Rubí players
UDA Gramenet footballers
Terrassa FC footballers
UE Olot players
Villarreal CF B players
Hércules CF players
FC Andorra players
J2 League players
Tokyo Verdy players
Spanish expatriate footballers
Spanish expatriate sportspeople in Japan
Spanish expatriate sportspeople in Andorra
Expatriate footballers in Japan
Expatriate footballers in Andorra